The Design 1025 ship (full name Emergency Fleet Corporation Design 1025) was a steel-hulled cargo ship design approved for production by the United States Shipping Boards Emergency Fleet Corporation (EFT) in World War I. They were referred to as the "Harriman-type" as the majority of ships were built in the Harriman section of Bristol, Pennsylvania. A total of 62 ships were ordered and built at three shipyards: 40 ships at Merchant Shipbuilding Corporation, Bristol, Pennsylvania; 12 ships at Newburgh Shipyards in Newburgh, New York; and 10 ships at Pensacola Shipbuilding Company in Pensacola, Florida.

References

Bibliography

External links
 EFC Design 1025: Illustrations

Standard ship types of the United States
Design 1025 ships
Design 1025 ships of the United States Navy